Jacob Nasirov is a prominent Bukharian rabbi residing in Jamaica Estates, Queens, New York. His family originated in Bukhara and immigrated to Afghanistan in 1932. At age 5, his family made aliyah to Israel. After serving in the Israel Defense Forces and working for a few years, in 1980 he was called to serve as the hazan and rabbi of Anshei Shalom synagogue, the only Afghan-Jewish congregation in the United States. He is currently the Rabbi of Congregation Bet-El - Sephardic Center of Jamaica Estates.  Nasirov was at one time a kosher certifier of restaurants, but he is no longer involved in this.

Sources
 Lee, Felicia R. "Coping: Afghan Jews Look Back in Sorrow" New York Times Dec. 30, 2001
 Pomerance, Rachel "Because 'Jews are news,' feuding Afghans make CNN" Jewish Telegraphic Agency  Dec. 14, 2001
 Bio on Synagogue website

Living people
Afghan Orthodox Jews
Afghan Jews
Bukharan rabbis
American Orthodox rabbis
People from Queens, New York
Afghan emigrants to Israel
Israeli emigrants to the United States
Afghan emigrants to the United States
Afghan religious leaders
Israeli people of Afghan-Jewish descent
Year of birth missing (living people)
20th-century American rabbis
21st-century American rabbis